Macho Women with Guns (MWWG) is a comedy role-playing game created by Greg Porter and published by Blacksburg Tactical Research Center (BTRC).  (A D20 System version of the game is also available from Mongoose Publishing.)  Nominally a science-fiction game, it parodies both action films and other role-playing games.

Setting
Macho Women with Guns is set in a near-future America where society has collapsed due to the misdeeds of the Reagan administration. Taking advantage of the earthly chaos, Satan has dispatched her female minions, the Batwinged Bimbos From Hell, to rebuild society in a form she approves of.  The Vatican has responded to Satan's plans by dispatching its elite group of warrior nuns, The Sisters of Our Lady of Harley-Davidson to combat the bimbos. The two groups of women compete (sometimes violently) to rebuild civilization by vanquishing post-apocalyptic menaces and male chauvinism.

Dimensional warps caused by the conflict have opened connections to a series of parallel universes, each of which represents a different genre environment such as fantasy, Lovecraftian horror or science fiction. These universes, along with Earth, constitute a campaign setting that Macho Women with Guns calls The Machoverse.

Player characters in Macho Women with Guns are buxom women with a penchant for revealing clothing who engage in combat with otherworldly menaces like the Puppies of Tindalos, satirical representations of male chauvinism such as Drunken Frat Boys, and occasionally each other. Non-women opponents in the game are usually referred to as critters.

System
Character generation in Macho Women with Guns uses a character point system.  Each character begins with 75 points which are used to buy attributes and skills.  The five attributes (Strength, Dexterity, Macho, Looks, and Health; notably, there is no Intelligence attribute) are rated on an open-ended scale with a minimum starting score of eight.  Skills are ranked by the bonus they provide to task resolution roles, i.e. "+1", "+2", etc.

MWWG uses a roll of three six-sided dice for all task resolutions, including combat. The base chance of a character succeeding at an action is determined by the character's score in a relevant attribute (usually Strength or Dexterity), adjusted by situational modifiers (including skills) determined by the gamemaster. The player of that character then rolls three six-sided dice—If the sum of the dice is less than or equal to the adjusted number, the character succeeds at the action. Most die roles in Macho Women with Guns use six-sided dice, but four-sided and three-sided dice may be needed for some rolls.

A signature mechanic of Macho Women with Guns is the Macho Attack, which allows a player character to intimidate their enemies with a display of raw charisma by making a roll against their character's Macho score.  The opponent then rolls against their Macho score (with modifiers determined by the player character's roll). An opponent who fails their Macho roll is temporarily stunned by the player character, and unable to act.

History

The original Macho Women with Guns  was designed in 1988 by Greg Porter, owner of BTRC, in a period of less than two-weeks.  The 12-page booklet was published in August of that year, and became BTRC's most popular product.

The following year, BTRC released two supplements written by Porter.  The first, Batwinged Bimbos From Hell, introduced key background details of the Machoverse, as well as rules for aerial movement.  The second supplement, Renegade Nuns on Wheels, featured more information about the campaign setting, and rules for ground vehicles. Especially in the vehicular damage system, it parodied the flow chart-approach of Renegade Legion's Interceptor.

BTRC also released a slightly-revised version of the original rule booklet, which included cross-references to the new supplements.  Although the inside cover of the revised booklet identifies it as "Second Edition, May 1989", there were no major rules changes.  (Few, if any, gamers acknowledge this booklet as a different edition.) Porter's collection of adventures for MWWG, The Final Chapter (Part One) was published in 1990.

In 1994, BTRC published a 70-page softcover book entitled Macho Women with Guns (2nd Edition), which combined and expanded material from the four earlier books (Porter 1994a). It was supported by a single collection of adventures published in 1995, More Excuses to Kill Things.  BTRC has not published any new MWWG material since 1994, but eight other game companies have produced products under license from BTRC.

The first licensed products to appear were translations for overseas markets, some of which added new material. In 1992 Italian publisher Granata Press published Maschiacce armate pesantemente [Heavily-Armed Tomboys] and the two supplements SuoCeR - Suore Centaure Rinnegate and PAPI - Pupe con Ali di Pipistrello dall'Inferno on its role-playing games magazine Kaos, with new artwork by famed comic artist Giuseppe Palumbo and Romeo Gallo. In 1995 Nexus Editrice collected them in a book together with an additional adventure  and in 1996 Qualitygame released a small "Pochettravel EditionTM" with the MWWG original rulebook only . In 1994 Brazilian game company Devir Livraria Limitada released a Portuguese translation (Porter 1994b) titled Mulheres Machonas Armadas até os Dentes [Macho Women Armed to the Teeth]. German publisher Spielzeit released an 84-page translation using the title Macho Weiber Mit Dicken Kanonen [Macho Broads with Big Guns]. Macho Weiber - Rollenspielsystem-Uebersicht bei drosi.de.

In August 1998, Archangel Entertainment released Fun Guys from Yuggoth: The Macho Women Card Game (a pun on H. P. Lovecraft's sci-fi poem "Fungi from Yuggoth"), and its one supplement, A Fistful of Cardboard: Fun Guys from Yuggoth Expansion. Archangel Entertainment - Macho Women with Guns

Two companies produced licensed gaming miniatures for Macho Women with Guns.  Simtac LLC created a line of metal miniatures. [TMP] Macho Women with Guns In 2001, Cumberland Games began distributing a TrueType font that allows gamers to print an unlimited supply of paper figures for use in Macho Women with Guns. 

In 2002, French gaming company Le Septième Cercle released a 112-page French-language version of the 1994 rules. The French version retains the English title. Macho Women with Guns

In August 2003, Mongoose Publishing produced a D20 System version of Macho Women with Guns, written by James Desborough and Nathan Webb.  Three supplements (only available in PDF format) are available for the D20 version of the game: Macho Women with Guns - Diet Edition, Adolf Hitler - Porn Star, and The Sex Presidents. Mongoose Publishing : For All Your Gaming Needs ...

Reviews
White Wolf Inphobia #52 (Feb., 1995)

Other recognition
A copy of Macho Women with Guns is held in the collection of the Strong National Museum of Play (object 110.3191).

References

External links
 Macho Women With Guns on RPGGeek

Bibliography

Gamewyrd: Interview with Greg Porter, retrieved June 4, 2006
Guide du Rôliste Galactique: Macho Women with Guns, retrieved June 4, 2006
Mongoose Publishing: Macho Women with Guns, retrieved June 4, 2006
Nexus Games: Maschiacce Armate Pesantemente, retrieved June 6, 2006
 Porter, Greg 1994a. "Macho Women, 2nd edition is here!", rec.games.frp.misc
Porter, Greg 1994b. "Macho Women w/Guns in Brasil", rec.games.frp.misc
Sparks: Macho Women with Guns, retrieved June 4, 2006
The Miniatures Page: Macho Women with Guns, retrieved June 4, 2006

Blacksburg Tactical Research Center games
Comedy role-playing games
Role-playing games introduced in 1988